Arta Dade (born 15 March 1953) is an Albanian politician and former member of Parliament for the Socialist Party. She served from 1997–2007. During her political career, she held several government posts such as Minister of Culture and Minister of Foreign Affairs, being the first women to be appointed as a Foreign minister. She is currently Chairwoman of the Committee on Foreign Policy.

Dade was born in Tirana. She graduated from the University of Tirana in English Literature and has worked as a lecturer in the University until 1997, when she started her political career. She represents Fier County in the Parliament.

References

Living people
1953 births
Politicians from Tirana
University of Tirana alumni
Albanian translators
Culture ministers of Albania
21st-century Albanian politicians
21st-century Albanian women politicians
Government ministers of Albania
Women government ministers of Albania
Female foreign ministers
Albanian women diplomats
Members of the Parliament of Albania
Women members of the Parliament of Albania
21st-century translators